The Utah Medical Cannabis Act is an initiative to legalize medical cannabis that qualified to appear on the November 2018 ballot in the U.S. state of Utah as Proposition 2.

A group called Utah Patients Coalition filed the  initiative  in June, 2017. By the beginning of the year, the group had gathered more than half of the 113,000 signatures required to get an initiative for medical cannabis on the November ballot. The initiative allows for topicals, cannabis oil, cannabis edibles and vaping, but not smoking. Polls in the second half of 2017 showed up to 78% support for the initiative. 

On March 26, the Lieutenant Governor's office validated 117,000 signatures on the Utah Medical Cannabis Act initiative, enough for it to get on the November ballot. On May 29, the Lieutenant Governor announced that over 153,000 signatures had been validated, and the initiative would still be appearing on the November ballot, despite a contentious effort by initiative opponents to have some names removed.

Groups and individuals supporting and opposing the initiative
Some groups and individuals have made their position on the inititiative known.

Support
The sponsor, Utah Patients Coalition, was joined by Together for Responsible Use and Cannabis Education (TRUCE) Utah and by a Koch funded lobbying group with ties to faith leaders in the Legislature, Libertas Institute.

Opposition
Governor Gary Herbert stated on March 29 that he would "actively oppose" the initiative. The Utah Medical Association urged voters who signed the petition to call county clerks to have their names removed.

After initially "repeatedly declin[ing] to weigh in" with media on its position, the LDS Church issued a statement on April 10 and another compiled by Kirton McConkie on May 11 endorsing the Utah Medical Association's position and opposing the initiative.

References

External links
 at Lieutenant Governor's elections page
Utah Medical Marijuana Initiative (2018) at Ballotpedia

2018 cannabis law reform
Cannabis in Utah
Proposed laws of the United States
Medical Cannabis Act